The curlfin sole (Pleuronichthys decurrens) is a species of flatfish in the family Pleuronectidae. It was first described to science by David Starr Jordan and Charles Henry Gilbert, his long-time mentee.

Its native habitat is the subtropical waters of the eastern Pacific, from Prince William Sound, Alaska in the north to San Quintín, Baja California in the south.

Description

The curlfin sole is a right-eyed flatfish with large, closely set eyes and a small mouth. The upper surface is reddish brown to dark brown or black, usually with brown or grey mottling; the underside is light. The fins are dark in colour, and the caudal fin is rounded. There is a high, bony ridge between the eyes with a blunt spine at each end.

Diet
The diet of the curlfin sole consists mainly of zoobenthos polychaetes, crustacean eggs and brittle stars.

Reproduction
The curlfin sole spawns from April to August, and eggs hatch within seven days of fertilisation.

References

curlfin sole
Western North American coastal fauna
curlfin sole
Taxa named by David Starr Jordan